Joshua T. Vogelstein is an American biomedical engineer. He is an Associate Professor of Biomedical Engineering at Johns Hopkins University, where he sits at the Center for Imaging Science. Vogelstein also holds joint appointments in the departments of Applied Mathematics and Statistics, Computer Science, Electrical and Computer Engineering, Biostatistics, and Neuroscience. He has appointments in the Institute for Data Intensive Engineering and Sciences, Institute for Computational Medicine, Kavli Neuroscience Discovery Institute, and the Mathematical Institute for Data Science. 

His research focuses primarily on the intersection of natural and artificial intelligence. Our group develops and applies high-dimensional nonlinear machine learning methods to biomedical data science challenges. We have published over 100 papers in prominent scientific and engineering journals and conferences including Nature, Science, PNAS, Neurips, and JMLR, with over 10,000 citations and an h-index over 40. We received funding from the Transformative Research Award from NIH, the NSF CAREER award, Microsoft Research, and many other government, for-profit and nonprofit organizations. He has advised over 60 trainees, and taught about 200 students in his eight years as faculty. In addition to his academic work, he co-founded Global Domain Partners, a quantitative hedge fund that was acquired by Mosaic Investment Partners in 2012, and software startup Gigantum, which was acquired by nVidia in early 2022. He is currently the Chief Intelligence Officer for Sensie.

Education 
Vogelstein did his undergraduate studies at McKelvey School of Engineering at Washington University in St. Louis where he received his Bachelor of Science degree in Biomedical Engineering in 2002.  From 2003 to 2009 he studied at Johns Hopkins University, where he received his Master of Science in Applied Mathematics & Statistics and a Ph.D. in Neuroscience from the Johns Hopkins School of Medicine, where he developed algorithms for spike detection in calcium imaging.

Academia 

From 2014 to 2018, Vogelstein was the Director of Undergraduate Studies for the Institute for Computational Medicine. He has also held positions as an Endeavor Scientist at the Child Mind Institute, a Senior Research Scientist for the departments of Statistical Sciences & Mathematics & Neurobiology at Johns Hopkins University, and as Affiliated Faculty at Duke University. 

Joshua Vogelstein founded and directs the NeuroData lab, which has created an ecosystem of open-source tools for neuroscientists and hosts a collection of open-source data.

Vogelstein's research focuses on understanding how massive biomedical datasets are best analyzed to discover new knowledge about the function of living systems in health and disease, and how this knowledge can be harnessed to provide improved, more affordable health care. One of Vogelstein's current areas of study is connectal coding, an emerging field focusing on the study of how brain structure, rather than brain activity, encodes information; this represents a shift from the traditional study of neural coding. His work focuses largely on big and wide data in neuroscience, focusing on the statistics of brain graphs and connectomics.

Industry 

Joshua Vogelstein has been on the advisory board for numerous commercial companies, including Gigantum, Mind-X, and PivotalPath.  Vogelstein has also held the position of Chief Data Scientist at Global Domain Partners, LLC.
He is currently the Chief Intelligence Officer for Sensie.
He works extensively with Microsoft Research.

References

External links 
 NeuroData website
 Joshua Vogelstein's personal website
 Sensie

Living people
McKelvey School of Engineering alumni
Johns Hopkins Biomedical Engineering faculty
21st-century American biologists
American computer scientists
American biomedical engineers
Jewish scientists
1980 births
Johns Hopkins School of Medicine alumni